Hypercompe persephone is a moth of the family Erebidae first described by Tessmann in 1928. It is found in Peru.

References

Hypercompe
Moths described in 1928